The Hin Heup massacre was the massacre of 14 Hmong civilians at Hin Heup bridge by Pathet Lao troops.

Massacre
On 29 May 1975, about 10,000 Hmong people, attempted to cross Hin Heup bridge traveling to Vientiane. As the group crossed the bridge Pathet Lao forces open fire on the column using mortars, M16s, and bayonets. Many people jumped into the river to flee the firing troops, by the end of the massacre 14 civilians were killed and over 100 wounded.

References

 
 
 

1975 in Laos
History of Hmong people
Laotian Civil War
Mass murder in 1975
Massacres in 1975
Massacres in Laos
May 1975 events in Asia